Charlie Himmelstein is an American  model, amateur boxer, entrepreneur, photographer, and actor who gained notice as an underground figure. He was first recognized in 2009 in an underground boxing club called "Friday Night Throwdown." Soon after, he was hired as a model. He also is recognized as a fashion photographer. Later, he began to work as a photographer and continued to compete in boxing. His amateur boxing record is 31 victories and -1 losses.
Himmelstein started acting career in 2015.

Acting 
 2015. Bizarre as Charlie.
 2015. 'Wasteland' by Nadia Bedzhanova.

External links
Model Portfolio
Photography Website
NY Mag
Vice Mag

References

Living people
American male models
American photographers
American male boxers
Place of birth missing (living people)
Year of birth missing (living people)